Tsinilla tristis is a species of moth of the family Tortricidae. It is found in Pichincha Province, Ecuador.

The wingspan is about 18.5 mm. The forewings are brownish, scaled with whitish and with various white dots. There is a curved subterminal row of dots followed by a rust-brown apical area. The hindwings are greyish brown.

Etymology
The species name refers to the monotone colouration of the species and is derived from Latin tristis (meaning sad).

References

	

Moths described in 2008
Olethreutini
Taxa named by Józef Razowski